Karnataka State Highway 77 (KA SH 77) is a state highway that runs through Uttara Kannada and Shivamogga districts in the Indian state of Karnataka. This state highway touches numerous cities like Sirsi, Banavasi, Soraba, Sagara, and Hosanagara (NH 766C).

References

Roads in Uttara Kannada district
Roads in Shimoga district